Lisa Alexander (born September 22, 1968) is a Canadian former competitor in synchronised swimming and Olympic medallist.

Career
Born in Toronto, Ontario, Alexander began synchronized swimming at age eight. She had success in solo, duet and team events. Her original duet partner was Kathy Glen, with whom she would win a bronze medal at the 1991 World Aquatics Championships in Perth. Her second duet partner was Erin Woodley they would win gold at the 1994 Commonwealth Games, where Alexander would also win a gold in the solo event. At the 1994 World Aquatics Championships she would bring home three medals, a silver in team, a bronze in solo and a silver in duet. She and Woodley would then go on to win a silver medal in duet at the 1995 Pan American Games in Mar del Plata, Argentina. Alexander's most notable achievement was being team captain of Canadian team that received a silver medal in team event at the 1996 Summer Olympics in Atlanta.

Other work
Alexander was President of the Mississauga Sports Council and coached future Olympians at the Etobicoke Olympium.

Honours
Alexander was Ontario's Female Athlete of the Year in 1995. Alexander was inducted into the Mississauga Sports Hall of Fame in 1999.

References
sports-reference

External links
Mississauga Sports Hall of Fame profile

1968 births
Living people
Canadian synchronized swimmers
Olympic silver medalists for Canada
Olympic synchronized swimmers of Canada
Swimmers from Toronto
Synchronized swimmers at the 1996 Summer Olympics
Commonwealth Games gold medallists for Canada
Olympic medalists in synchronized swimming
World Aquatics Championships medalists in synchronised swimming
Synchronized swimmers at the 1991 World Aquatics Championships
Medalists at the 1996 Summer Olympics
Commonwealth Games medallists in synchronised swimming
Pan American Games medalists in synchronized swimming
Pan American Games silver medalists for Canada
Synchronized swimmers at the 1987 Pan American Games
Synchronized swimmers at the 1995 Pan American Games
Medalists at the 1995 Pan American Games
Synchronised swimmers at the 1994 Commonwealth Games
20th-century Canadian women
21st-century Canadian women
Medallists at the 1994 Commonwealth Games